Afromelittia occidentalis is a moth of the family Sesiidae. It is known from the Republic of the Congo, South Africa and Uganda.

References

Sesiidae
Insects of Uganda
Moths of Africa
Fauna of the Republic of the Congo
Moths described in 1917